Lieutenant-General James Murray, 1st Baron Glenlyon  (29 May 1782 – 12 October 1837), styled as  Lord James Murray until 1821, was a British Army officer, Member of Parliament and peer.

Life
Murray was born in 1782 at Dunkeld, Perthshire, the son of John Murray, 4th Duke of Atholl and his wife the Hon. Jane Cathcart. He was first commissioned into the British Army in 1798 and rose to the rank of Major-General by 1819. In 1807, he was elected Member of Parliament for Perthshire, holding the seat until 1812. He served as a Gentleman of the Bedchamber from 1812 to 1832 and from 1813 to 1819 was also aide-de-camp to the Prince Regent. He was created Baron Glenlyon, of Glenlyon, Perthshire, on 17 July 1821, and was promoted Lieutenant-General in 1837.

He also managed family affairs on behalf of his older brother John Murray, 5th Duke of Atholl, who had been declared insane at age 20.

According to the Legacies of British Slave-Ownership at the University College London, Glenlyon was awarded a payment as a slave trader in the aftermath of the Slavery Abolition Act 1833 with the Slave Compensation Act 1837. The British Government took out a £15 million loan (worth £ in ) with interest from Nathan Mayer Rothschild and Moses Montefiore which was subsequently paid off by the British taxpayers (ending in 2015). Glenlyon was associated with "T71/892 St Vincent nos. 492A & B; 497A & B; 498A & B", he owned 610 slaves at Saint Vincent and the Grenadines and received a £15,765 payment at the time (worth £ in ).

Lord Glenlyon died at Fenton's Hotel, St James's Street, London, on 12 October 1837, aged fifty-five, and was buried on 30 October at Dunkeld. He died intestate.

Wife and children
On 19 May 1810 Murray married Lady Emily Frances Percy (7 January 1789 – 21 June 1844), a daughter of General Hugh Percy, 2nd Duke of Northumberland, and his wife, Frances Julia Burrell, at St Martin-in-the-Fields, Covent Garden, London. They had four children:
Hon. Frances Julia Murray (died 4 November 1868), who married Colonel Hon. Charles Henry Maynard, the son of Henry Maynard, 3rd Viscount Maynard, and had no children 
Hon. Charlotte Augusta Leopoldina Murray (died 2 May 1889), who married Reverend Court Granville and had no children
George Murray, 6th Duke of Atholl (born 20 September 1814, died 16 January 1864)
Colonel the Hon. James Charles Plantagenet Murray (born 8 December 1819, died 3 June 1874), who married Elizabeth Marjory Fairholme and had three daughters.

Honours
Fellow of the Royal Society, 9 April 1818.
Knight Commander of the Hanoverian Order, 1820.

References

External links 
 

1782 births
1837 deaths
Barons in the Peerage of the United Kingdom
Peers of the United Kingdom created by George IV
Fellows of the Royal Society
Members of the Parliament of the United Kingdom for Scottish constituencies
UK MPs 1807–1812
UK MPs who were granted peerages
British Army lieutenant generals
People from Perth and Kinross
Murray
James
18th-century Scottish people
19th-century Scottish people
People of Byzantine descent
Scottish slave owners
Recipients of payments from the Slavery Abolition Act 1833
Non-inheriting heirs presumptive